Blair Field is a stadium in Long Beach, California.  It originally opened in 1956 and is primarily used for baseball. It holds 3,238 people.  It is named for Frank Blair, the sports editor for the Long Beach Press-Telegram newspaper for 32 years.

Located in Recreation Park, it was constructed in 1958 and over the years has fostered local amateur baseball and hosted Moore League high school football and baseball teams, along with American Legion and Connie Mack baseball.  The Chicago Cubs baseball team held spring training at the ballpark in 1966, the Los Angeles Rams football team and Olympic teams have used the site for practice or exhibition games.

It is the home of the Long Beach State 49ers baseball team, "the Dirtbags," and former home of the defunct Western Baseball League team, the Long Beach Breakers, and the defunct Golden Baseball League team, the Long Beach Armada.

In 1992, $1.475 million was spent to renovate the 3,238-seat facility. New spectator seating, field lights, a playing field with state-of-the-art drainage system, and turf which exceeds professional baseball standards were installed.  Additional improvements, including 774 new box seats and a new scoreboard, were made in 1999.

In 2008, CSULB and the City of Long Beach built a new scoreboard with a full LCD color video screen and LED score displays.

Prior to the 2016 season, a new outfield fence was built. The new fence reduced the dimensions of the park, while providing a safer, padded barrier for outfielders. In 2017, the Troy & Danyll Tulowitzki Batting Facility as well as the Jered Weaver Bullpen were constructed.

Attendance
In 2012, the Dirtbags ranked 46th among Division I baseball programs in attendance, averaging 1,391 per home game.

Other uses
Blair Field has hosted six MTV Rock N' Jock softball games. It has also been the filming location for numerous film, TV, and commercial productions, including the movies Space Jam and Moneyball.

The Minnesota Vikings practiced at Blair Field prior to Super Bowl XI in nearby Pasadena.

Gallery

See also
 List of NCAA Division I baseball venues

References

External links
City of Long Beach Department of Parks and Recreation: Blair Field
Long Beach State Athletics: Blair Field
Digital Ballparks: Blair Field
Ballpark Reviews: Blair Field

Baseball venues in California
College baseball venues in the United States
Chicago Cubs spring training venues
Minor league baseball venues
High school football venues in California
Sports venues in Long Beach, California
Spring training ballparks
Long Beach State Dirtbags baseball
1958 establishments in California
Sports venues completed in 1958